Air India Flight 101 was a scheduled Air India passenger flight from Bombay to London, via Delhi, Beirut, and Geneva. On the morning of 24 January 1966 at 8:02 CET, on approach to Geneva, the Boeing 707 operating the flight accidentally flew into Mont Blanc in France, killing all 117 people on board. Among the victims was Dr. Homi Jehangir Bhabha, the founder and chairman of the Atomic Energy Commission of India.

The crash occurred just a few hundred feet away from where an Air India Lockheed 749 Constellation operating Air India Flight 245 on a charter flight, had crashed in 1950.

Accident
Air India Flight 101 was a scheduled flight from Bombay to London; and on the day of the accident was operated by a Boeing 707, registration VT-DMN and named Kangchenjunga. The Pilot-In-Command was an 18-year veteran, Captain Joe T. D'Souza. After leaving Bombay, it had made two scheduled stops, at Delhi and Beirut, and was en route to another stop at Geneva. At flight level 190, the crew was instructed to descend for Geneva International Airport after the aircraft had passed Mont Blanc. All 106 passengers and 11 crew were killed.

Alternative theories 
As the black box was never recovered, there is no way to verify that the pilot descended before Mont Blanc; some leaked files suggest that the aircraft was taken down by rapid decompression due an explosion in the cargo hold. The aircraft fuselage was spread across a wider area than the smaller area a controlled descent into terrain would suggest.

Casualties  
Among the 117 passengers who were killed was Dr. Homi Jehangir Bhabha, the founder and chairman of the Indian Atomic Energy Commission.

Aircraft
The Boeing 707–437 VT-DMN had first flown on 5 April 1961 and was delivered new to Air India on 25 May 1961. It had flown a total of 16,188 hours.
It was named Kangchenjunga, another high mountain.

Investigation
At the time, aircrew fixed the position of their aircraft as being above Mont Blanc by taking a cross-bearing from one VHF omnidirectional range (VOR) as they flew along a track from another VOR. However, the accident aircraft departed Beirut with one of its VOR receivers unserviceable.

The investigation concluded:

Recent discoveries
Much of the wreckage of the crashed Boeing still remains at the crash site. In 2008, a climber found some Indian newspapers dated 23 January 1966. An engine from Air India Flight 245, which had crashed at virtually the same spot sixteen years earlier in 1950, was also discovered.

Gregory Douglas, a journalist, conspiracy theorist, forger, and holocaust denier who claimed to have conducted telephone conversations with former CIA operative Robert Crowley in 1993, published a book called Conversations with the Crow in 2013. Douglas claimed Crowley told him the CIA had assassinated Indian nuclear scientist Homi Bhabha on board the flight, thirteen days after assassinating Indian Prime Minister Lal Bahadur Shastri, in order to thwart the Indian nuclear programme. This was allegedly done by setting up and exploding a bomb inside the cargo area of the plane. Indian media proceeded to report on these claims largely unquestioned.

On 21 August 2012, a  jute bag of diplomatic mail, stamped "On Indian Government Service, Diplomatic Mail, Ministry of External Affairs", was recovered by a mountain rescue worker and turned over to local police in Chamonix. An official with the Indian Embassy in Paris took custody of the mailbag, which was found to be a "Type C" diplomatic pouch meant for newspapers, periodicals, and personal letters. Indian diplomatic pouches "Type A" (classified information) and "Type B" (official communications) are still in use today; "Type C" mailbags were made obsolete with the advent of the Internet. The mailbag was found to contain, among other items, still-white and legible copies of The Hindu and The Statesman from mid-January 1966, Air India calendars, and a personal letter to the Indian consul-general in New York, C.J.K. Menon. The bag was flown back to New Delhi on a regular Air India flight, in the charge of C.R. Barooah, the flight purser. His father, R.C. Barooah, was the flight engineer on Air India Flight 101.

In September 2013, a French alpinist found a metal box marked with the Air India logo at the site of the plane crash on Mont Blanc containing rubies, sapphires and emeralds, valued at over €245,000, which he handed in to the police to be returned to the rightful owners. As no rightful owners were found, however, in December 2021, the gems were divided up equally between the alpinist and the Chamonix commune: each receiving €75,000. As part of her research for her book Crash au Mont-Blanc, which tells the story of the two Air India crashes on the mountain, Françoise Rey found a record of a box of emeralds sent to a man named Issacharov in London, described by Lloyd's.

In 2017, Daniel Roche, a Swiss climber who has searched the Bossons Glacier for wreckage from Air India Flights 245 and 101, found human remains and wreckage including a Boeing 707 aircraft engine. In July 2020, as a result of melting of the glacier, Indian newspapers from 1966 were found in good condition.

References

Notes

Bibliography

External links
 Final Report (Archive) – Bureau d'Enquêtes et d'Analyses pour la Sécurité de l'Aviation Civile 
 Cockburn, Barbara. "Air India 707 crash wreckage on Mont Blanc". Flight International. 24 January 2009.

1966 in France
Accidents and incidents involving the Boeing 707
101
Airliner accidents and incidents involving controlled flight into terrain
Aviation accidents and incidents in 1966
Aviation accidents and incidents in France
January 1966 events in Europe
Mont Blanc